Sîngera is a town in Chișinău municipality, Moldova. In addition, two villages are administered by the town, Dobrogea and Revaca. At the 2004 Moldovan Census, the population of the town itself was 7,354, that of Dobrogea, 3,279, and Revaca, 976. The total population was 11,609.
At this point in Singera functioning church in honor of the Holy Righteous Joachim and Anna.

International relations

Twin towns — Sister cities 
Sîngera is twinned with:
  Huși, Romania

References

Cities and towns in Chișinău Municipality
Cities and towns in Moldova